The London Pass is a sightseeing pass for tourists coming to London, the capital of United Kingdom. It consists of a smart card which entitles the holder to enter a number of tourist attractions in and around the London region having paid a set fee in advance. It is one of many such 'city passes' worldwide aimed at the international tourist market.

The pass comes in two basic forms: admissions only, or admissions plus Travelcard. The value any individual traveller or travellers derives from the pass depends on their own personal sightseeing preferences, and can be hard to determine.

The London Pass generally is available as a 1-day, 2-days, 3-days and 6-days pass that can be used within 12 months after purchasing it. This means, that tourists can order the pass before they travel. It becomes active as soon as the first sight is visited. The time frame available for visiting with the pass is based on a calendar day, not on 24 hours.

Attractions included on the London Pass
The pass includes entry to a number of attractions including:

 ArcelorMittal Orbit
 All Hallows by the Tower
 Apsley House
 Benjamin Franklin House
 British Music Experience
 The Cartoon Museum
 Charles Dickens Museum
 Chelsea FC Stadium Tour
 Chelsea Physic Garden
 Chislehurst Caves
 Churchill War Rooms
 Cutty Sark
 Eltham Palace
 Estorick Collection of Modern Italian Art
 Eton College
 Fan Museum
 Guards Museum
 Hampton Court Palace
 Handel House Museum
 HMS Belfast
 Imperial War Museum
 Jewel Tower
 Kensington Palace
 Kew Gardens
 The London Bridge Experience
 London Canal Museum

 London Transport Museum
 London Wetland Centre
 London Zoo
 National Gallery
 National Maritime Museum
 National Portrait Gallery
 Royal Air Force Museum
 Royal Albert Hall
 Royal Mews
 Royal Observatory Greenwich
 Shakespeare's Globe Theatre
 Southwark Cathedral
 St. Paul’s Cathedral
 Tate Britain
 Tate Modern
 The Banqueting House
 The Monument
 Tower Bridge Exhibition
 Tower of London
 The Postal Museum
 Wellington Arch
 Westminster Abbey
 Wimbledon Lawn Tennis Museum
 Windsor Castle

Each of these attractions has a London Pass machine at the ticket desk. An attendant scans the London Pass through this machine and allows the holder entry to the attraction without additional payment.

See also 
 Tourism in London
 Transport in London

References 

http://www.priceoftravel.com/3161/city-pass-strategies-get-the-most-out-of-your-paris-london-new-york-pass-etc/

External links
 
 London Pass Attractions Map

Tourism in London
Transport in London